KERM (98.3 FM) is a radio station broadcasting a country music format.  It is licensed to Torrington, Wyoming, United States. The station is currently owned by Kath Broadcasting, and features programming from ABC Radio.

History
The station went on the air as KERM.

References

External links

ERM
Country radio stations in the United States